The 1981–82 National League A was the 51st season of the top level association football competition in Switzerland since the establishment of the national league in 1931. Grasshopper, led by Timo Konietzka, won their 18th national title three points ahead of Servette and previous season's champions and cross-town rivals Zürich.

National League A

Overview
It was contested by 16 teams, and Grasshopper Club Zürich won the championship.

The league championship format was expanded from the 1980–81 season to include sixteen teams, including 13 clubs from the previous season and three sides promoted from the 1980–81 Nationalliga A. The league was contested in a double round robin format, with each club playing every other club twice, for a total of 30 rounds. Two points were awarded for wins and one point for draws.

League table

Results

Top scorers

National League B

League table

References
Table at RSSSF

Swiss Football League seasons
Swiss
1981–82 in Swiss football